The Yangon Adventist Seminary (YAS) is a Christian institution owned and operated by Seventh-day Adventist Church since 1975. It is opened to young people who want to study in Christian Atmosphere Non-Christian student who can make the agreement to follow the rules and regulations of the school may be accepted.
YAS is accredited by the Accrediting Association of Seventh-day Adventist School, Colleges, and Universities(AAA), Maryland, USA.

YAS has a proud tradition of recognizing outstanding, student achievement in all areas and practices Positive Behavior Support. The programs listed below are the prime examples of this tradition.

Academic Performance Award
Athletic Award

Principals 

1975-1985               Daw Yee Yee Shwe
1985-1990               Daw Noreen Shwe
1990-1991               U Jonathan Zaw Weik
1991-2002               U Claudius Brown
2002-2005               U Saw Lay Wah
2005-2013               U Claudius Brown 
2013-2016                U Kyaw Myint Naing
2016–Present           U Saw Lay Wah

External links

References

Seventh-day Adventist education
Education in Yangon
Educational institutions established in 1975
Seminaries and theological colleges in Myanmar
Christianity in Yangon